The Anglian Stage is the name used in the British Isles for a middle Pleistocene glaciation. It precedes the Hoxnian Stage and follows the Cromerian Stage in the British Isles. The Anglian Stage is correlated to Marine Isotope Stage 12 (MIS 12), which started about 478,000 years ago and ended about 424,000 years ago.

Description
The Anglian stage has often been correlated to the Elsterian Stage of northern Continental Europe and the Mindel Stage in the Alps. However, there is ambiguity regarding the correlation of these two glacials to either MIS 12 or MIS 10, as described in more detail in the article 'Elster glaciation'.

The Anglian was the most extreme glaciation during the last 2 million years. In Britain the ice sheet reached the Isles of Scilly and the Western Approaches, the furthest south the ice reached in any Pleistocene ice age. In the south-east of England it diverted the River Thames from its old course through the Vale of St Albans south to its present position.

This stage had been equated to the Kansan Stage in North America. However, the terms Kansan Stage, along with Yarmouth, Nebraskan, and Aftonian stages, have been abandoned by North American Quaternary geologists and merged into the Pre-Illinoian stage. The Anglian Stage is now correlated with the period of time which includes the Pre-Illinoian B glaciation of North America.

See also
Glacial period
Last glacial period
Timeline of glaciation

See also 
 Pleistocene, which covers:

References

Further reading

External links

 (Includes PDF file of map)

Shotton, F.W., nd, East Anglia and the English Midlands. Ice Age Britain., The Shotton Project, University of Birmingham, Birmingham, England.

Ice ages
Pleistocene

de:Elsterkaltzeit